is a former Japanese football player.

Club statistics

References

External links

j-league

1986 births
Living people
Chuo University alumni
Association football people from Yamanashi Prefecture
Japanese footballers
J1 League players
J2 League players
Ventforet Kofu players
Association football forwards